Damir Kreilach (born 16 April 1989) is a Croatian football midfielder who currently plays for and captains Real Salt Lake in Major League Soccer.

Career
Kreilach began his professional career with Rijeka in the Croatian first division, making his debut at 18 years old in the 2007–08 season, eventually playing 128 matches in six seasons while scoring 19 goals.  He was the club's top goalscorer in the 2011–12 season with nine goals.

He then moved to Union Berlin in the German second division for five seasons, scoring 33 goals in 147 matches, highlighted by a 12-goal season in 32 matches in 2015–16.

In February 2018, Kreilach signed with Real Salt Lake of Major League Soccer.

Career statistics

References

External links

1989 births
Living people
Sportspeople from Vukovar
Association football midfielders
Croatian footballers
Croatia youth international footballers
Croatia under-21 international footballers
HNK Rijeka players
1. FC Union Berlin players
Real Salt Lake players
Croatian Football League players
2. Bundesliga players
Major League Soccer players
Croatian expatriate footballers
Expatriate footballers in Germany
Expatriate soccer players in the United States
Croatian expatriate sportspeople in Germany
Croatian expatriate sportspeople in the United States
Designated Players (MLS)